Poornam Viswanathan (15 November 1921 – 1 October 2008) was an Indian actor who predominantly appeared in Tamil films. He started performing on stage at age 18. He worked as a reader for All India Radio, He was the first person in India to announce India was Independent on August 15 in All India Radio. He went on to act in films such as Chithram, Varusham 16, Thillu Mullu, Keladi Kanmani, Moondram Pirai, Aasai, Mahanadi and Varumaiyin Niram Sivappu. He had a son and two daughters. Viswanathan died on 1 October 2008.

Career

Viswanathan was known for his remarkable performances in Tamil theatre and films. In every role he played, he paid great attention to dialogue delivery and body language.

He started performing on stage when he was 18. He later moved to New Delhi for a few years, where he was part of the South Indian Troupe with dance and music critic Subbudu. Viswanathan worked as a news reader at All India Radio, and deemed it a matter of great pride to have announced the news of India obtaining independence in the first news bulletin broadcast on 15 August 1947.

He was transferred to Chennai in 1964. His portrayal of roles in plays scripted by Marina, such as Thanikuduthanam, Oor Vambu and Kaal Kattu, won him great acclaim. His performances in plays such as Kadavul Vandirundar, Adimaigal and Oonjal were similarly hailed by audiences. His passion for theatre inspired him to start a troupe of his own, called Poornam New Theatres.

He served the Press Information Bureau in Chennai as an assistant information officer and later served as editor of Thittam and senior correspondent for Yojana, magazines brought out by the Union Information and Broadcasting Ministry. He penned several plays and short stories. He was very interested in the fine arts and was often spotted at Sabhas during the December music festival.

He is known in Kollywood for his peculiar voice modulation.

He also starred in the Bollywood blockbuster Ek Duje Ke Liye (1981), in which he played the role of Kamal Hassan's strict father.

He is also known to Malayalam audiences for his role in the blockbuster Chithram with Mohanlal.

Filmography
This is a partial filmography. You can expand it.

Tamil

Malayalam

Hindi

References

External links
 

1921 births
2008 deaths
Indian male stage actors
Male actors in Malayalam cinema
Indian male film actors
Tamil male actors
Male actors from Chennai
Male actors in Tamil cinema
20th-century Indian male actors
Recipients of the Sangeet Natak Akademi Award